Chrysostomos (golden-mouthed) was a common epithet for orators. Chrysostomos or Chrysostom may refer to:
Dio Chrysostom (40–120), Greco-Roman philosopher
John Chrysostom (347–407), bishop of Constantinople and Christian church father and saint
Chrysostomos of Smyrna (1867–1922), Greek Orthodox bishop of Smyrna (1910–1914, 1919–1922) and saint in the Eastern Orthodox Church
Chrysostomos of Zakynthos (1890–1958), Greek Orthodox bishop of Zakynthos during the Second World War
Chrysostomos I of Messinia (1906–1961), Greek Orthodox bishop of Messinia during the Second World War
Archbishop Chrysostomos I of Athens (1868–1938), Archbishop of Athens (1923–1938)
Archbishop Chrysostomos II of Athens (1880–1968), Archbishop of Athens (1962–1967)
Archbishop Chrysostomos I of Cyprus (1927–2007), Archbishop of the Cypriot Orthodox Church (1977–2006)
Archbishop Chrysostomos II of Cyprus (1941–2022), Archbishop of the Cypriot Orthodox Church (2006–2022)
Chrysostomos, a town on Icaria, Greece

People with the name
Jan Chryzostom Pasek (1636–1701), Polish nobleman and writer
Ján Chryzostom Korec (1924–2015), Slovak Jesuit priest and cardinal of the Roman Catholic Church
Yoohanon Mar Chrysostom (born 1944), Catholic Bishop of the Eparchy of Pathanamthitta, Kerala, India

See also
Chrysostome (disambiguation)
Chrysostomus (disambiguation)
Crisostomo